Peter G. Thielke (born 1968) is an American historian of modern philosophy who specializes in Immanuel Kant, German idealism, epistemology, and aesthetics. He is the Robert C. Denison Professor of Philosophy at Pomona College in Claremont, California.

Early life and education 
Thielke was born in 1968. He earned his bachelor's degree at Stanford University, his master's at the University of Pennsylvania, and his PhD at the University of California, San Diego.

Career 
Thielke came to Pomona College in 2001.

Personal life 
Thielke lives in Claremont. He is married to Sheri Pym, a federal magistrate judge. In 2003, his home was destroyed when a plane crashed into it.

References

External links
Faculty page at Pomona College

1968 births
Living people
Pomona College faculty
American historians of philosophy
Kant scholars
21st-century American philosophers
Epistemologists
Philosophers of art
Continental philosophers